Satchurated: Live in Montreal is a live album and concert film by American guitarist Joe Satriani. The film was released in both 2D and 3D formats to theatres worldwide during March 2012, before the DVD/Blu-ray, as well as an audio version on CD, was released in April 2012. It is the first 3D concert film to be mixed in Dolby 7.1 surround sound. It was recorded at the Metropolis Theatre in Montreal, Quebec, Canada on December 12, 2010 during Satriani's Wormhole Tour and the film was directed by award-winning film-makers Pierre and François Lamoureux.

Track listing 
All songs written by Joe Satriani.

Disc 1
"Ice 9" - 5:14
"Hordes of Locusts" - 4:54
"Flying in a Blue Dream" - 6:32
"Light Years Away" - 6:26
"Memories" - 8:56
"War" - 6:32
"Premonition" - 4:26
"Satch Boogie" - 4:57
"Revelation" - 7:47
"Pyrrhic Victoria" - 5:15
"Crystal Planet" - 5:42
"The Mystical Potato Head Groove Thing" - 6:51
"Dream Song" - 4:57

Disc 2
"God Is Crying" - 8:06
"Andalusia" - 6:22
"Solitude" - 0:59
"Littleworth Lane" - 3:47
"Why" - 7:08
"Wind in the Trees" - 9:03
"Always with Me, Always with You" - 3:50
"Big Bad Moon" - 9:07
"Crowd Chant" - 3:44
"Summer Song" - 8:26
"Two Sides to Every Story" - 4:14
"The Golden Room" - 7:19
Disc 2 also contains the bonus video "Inside the Wormhole".

Personnel 
Musicians 
Joe Satriani - lead guitar, lead vocals
Jeff Campitelli - drums
Allen Whitman - bass
Mike Keneally - keyboards, percussion
Galen Henson - rhythm guitar

Production
Pierre Lamoureux - concert film director, producer
François Lamoureux - concert film director, audio recording, producer 
Mike Fraser - mixing
Denis Normandeau - audio recording
Mike Boden - digital editing
Martin Julien - concert film editor
Yves Dion - concert film editor
Adam Ayan - mastering
Éric Beauséjour - art direction
Jay Blakesberg - cover photo

Charts

Weekly charts

References

External links 
  Satchurated: Live in Montreal official site

Joe Satriani live albums
2012 live albums
3D concert films